Thomas Spencer (7 November 1851 – 25 July 1905) was an English businessman, known for being the co-founder with Michael Marks of Marks & Spencer, a major British retailer.

Early life
Spencer was born on 7 November 1851 in Skipton, Yorkshire. He moved to Leeds before he was 21 and worked as a book-keeper for a wholesale company started by Isaac Jowitt Dewhirst.

Marks & Spencer
Spencer and Michael Marks met when Dewhirst lent Marks money  to run his stalls in Leeds. In 1894, when Marks had opened a permanent store in Leeds market he invited Spencer to become a partner in what became Marks & Spencer. Spencer decided that the £300 required for a half-share in the business would be a good investment.

The running of the business was split between Spencer, who managed the office and warehouse, and Marks, who continued to run the market stalls. Spencer had developed some important contacts while working for Isaac Dewhirst and these allowed him to get the best prices for goods by dealing directly with the manufacturers.

In 1903, Marks & Spencer became a limited company: Spencer retired later that year.

Personal life
Spencer met and married Agnes Spencer Whitfield at St Saviour, Cross Green, Leeds, in 1892. Whitfield was born in the village of Marton, now a part of Middlesbrough. Together they had a son named Thomas Spencer Jr.

Spencer died on 25 July 1905, in Whittington, Staffordshire. His wife continued to fund charitable work such as the Church of St Agnes in Easterside, Middlesbrough, after his death, and died in 1959, now buried in the graveyard of St Cuthbert's Parish Church in Marton.

References

External links 
Marks and Spencer website

1851 births
1905 deaths
British retail company founders
People from Skipton
Burials in Staffordshire
19th-century English businesspeople